Nightmare Next Door is a TV series which aired on Investigation Discovery. It is a documentary series which features reenactments of murders. Its theme is true crime. It is responsible for bringing some crime cases to national attention. Episodes typically consist of interviews with investigators, prosecutors and family members coupled with re-enactments using actors. The series focuses on crimes that occurred in small American communities. 

The series covered some notable cases like: McKinney quadruple murder, Disappearance of Michele Anne Harris, the murder of Katie Sepich, the crimes of Eugene Britt, Alec Devon Kreider or Adam Leroy Lane.

It has attracted criticism and mostly poor reviews due to the serious subject matter being narrated with continuous attempts at humour with puns, word games and 'dad' jokes, even when discussing murdered babies.

References

External links

Investigation Discovery original programming
True crime television series
2011 American television series debuts
2016 American television series endings